Pattaya United Football Club was a Thai football club based in Pattaya, Chonburi Province. Defunct after the 2018 season, the club was renamed to Samut Prakan City and relocated to Samut Prakan.

Pattaya United's first-ever competitive game was against Thailand Division 2 League side Rajpracha in the 2009 Queen's Cup which they won 5–0. For six years the club remained in the TPL, and finished as high as sixth, and fourth in 2010 and 2011 respectively. The Dolphins were relegated to the Yamaha League One in 2014 and promoted to Thai League 1 again in 2016.

History

Coke-Bangpra Chonburi
The club was founded under the name Coke-Bangpra Chonburi FC which derived from the sponsor and the community Bang Phra in the district of Si Racha, the province of Chonburi. After several years in the Provincial League of Thailand, the club was promoted to the Thai Premier League for the 2008 season. As a result of the promotion to the TPL, the team was renamed to "Pattaya United" and moved to the city of Pattaya. In the first season in the top-flight division, the team finished in 11th place at the end of the season.

Pattaya United
The team moved to Pattaya for the 2008 season, and changed its name to Pattaya United FC (The Dolphins), in their first season under the new name the team finished in 11th place in the Thai Premier League, only avoiding relegation in the final game of the season. However, the following seasons the team improved to finishing as high as sixth, and fourth in 2010 and 2011 respectively. The team which has always been looked at as a "little brother" team to Chonburi FC as they both were owned by the Kunpluem family, an affluence local family in Chonburi province. The club has shown potentials, winning against teams with double or triple its annual budget, winning the hearts of the Thai, and Foreign fans alike. After spending 6 years in the TPL, and the Dolphins were relegated to the Yamaha League One in 2014. During the offseason, the future of the club was uncertain with various speculations.

However, in January 2015 the club was sold to Enigma Sports Ventures (ESV), the sporting arm of the Enigma Global. It marked the first change in ownership in the club history, after several lucrative bids were submitted for the Kunpluem family's consideration. The family and Pattaya United board felt that the club's best interest and future lie with Enigma Sports Ventures. The new ownership's management team moves very quickly in rebranding the club, appointing the new President is, Club's first foreign Head Coach, and securing 8 top players from TPL to play in Division One. Many players were former first elevens players from Muangthong United, as well as couple thai and foreign national team players. In 2016, Pattaya United was taken over by the Kiarti Thanee Group led by Tanet Phanichewa.

Renaming and relocation to Samut Prakan
At the end of season 2018, club owner decided to change the club name to Samut Prakan City and relocated to Samut Prakan Province due to local politic conflict.

Rivalries
The club's fierce local rivals are Chonburi and Sriracha which all are in the same province of Chonburi. Despite all three teams were previously own by the Kunpluem family, they have always compete hard against one another. Also the team over the years were not often in the same division/league as one another, when they met the game have always been a very highest attendance games. In recent years, the rivalries between Chonburi and Pattaya have been the most highly anticipated game of the year in Chonburi Province.

Stadium
Nong Prue Stadium, formally known as Nongprue Municipality Stadium in Pattaya originally designed to hold just over 3,000 spectators, but over the year the additional seats were required to accommodate more fans. So as the result of that, the stadium was renovated once in 2011. Under the new ownership of Enigma Sport Ventures, the stadium is currently undergo the renovation to accommodate up to 5,500 spectators. As well as additional required upgrades by the TPL to make the stadium competition worthy for the 2015 season. In addition to the renovation to the stadium, the new gift shop and club onsite office are added to the stadium ground.

Stadium and locations by season records

Season by season records

 P = Played
 W = Games won
 D = Games drawn
 L = Games lost
 F = Goals for
 A = Goals against
 Pts = Points
 Pos = Final position

 TPL = Thai Premier League
TL = Thai League 1
 DIV 1 = 2015 Thai Division 1 League

 QR1 = First Qualifying Round
 QR2 = Second Qualifying Round
 QR3 = Third Qualifying Round
 QR4 = Fourth Qualifying Round
 RInt = Intermediate Round
 R1 = Round 1
 R2 = Round 2
 R3 = Round 3

 R4 = Round 4
 R5 = Round 5
 R6 = Round 6
 GR = Group stage
 QF = Quarter-finals
 SF = Semi-finals
 RU = Runners-up
 S = Shared
 W = Winners

Coaches
Coaches by Years (2007–2018)

  Pansak Ketwattha 
  Jadet Meelarp 
  Thawatchai Damrong-Ongtrakul 
  Jatuporn Pramualban 
  Chalermwoot Sa-ngapol 
  Jadet Meelarp 
  Songyod Klinsrisook 
  Sean Sainsbury 
  Surapong Kongthep 
  Lim Jong-heon 
  Miloš Joksić 
  Kim Hak-chul  
  Surapong Kongthep

Honours

Domestic competitions
Thai League 2 
Runners-up (1): 2015

References

External links
 https://web.archive.org/web/20171014111404/http://www.pattayaunited.com/

 
Defunct football clubs in Thailand
Thai League 1 clubs
Association football clubs established in 1989
Football clubs in Thailand
Sport in Chonburi province
1989 establishments in Thailand
Association football clubs disestablished in 2018
2018 disestablishments in Thailand